Tropylium tetrafluoroborate is an organic compound with the formula . Containing the tropylium cation and the non-coordinating tetrafluoroborate counteranion, tropylium tetrafluoroborate is a rare example of a readily isolable carbocation. It is a white solid.

This compound may be prepared by the reaction of cycloheptatriene with phosphorus pentachloride, followed by tetrafluoroboric acid.

See also
 Triphenylmethyl chloride, also known as trityl chloride.

References

Tetrafluoroborates
Carbocations
Non-benzenoid aromatic carbocycles